Gregory McMahon (March 19, 1915 – June 27, 1989) was a United States Representative from New York. Born in New York City, he attended a parochial school and was graduated from St. John's Prep School (Brooklyn) in 1933 and from St. John's University in 1938. He also attended St. John's Law School from 1939 to 1941 and was a certified public accountant since 1939. He taught at St. John's College from 1939 to 1942 and served in the United States Navy as an ensign from December 1941 to October 1945, serving in the Pacific.

McMahon was elected as a Republican to the Eightieth Congress, holding office from January 3, 1947 to January 3, 1949. He was an unsuccessful candidate for reelection in 1948 to the Eighty-first Congress and was an accountant and tax consultant. He was a resident of Garden City until his death in 1989.

References

1915 births
1989 deaths
St. John's University (New York City) alumni
United States Navy officers
Republican Party members of the United States House of Representatives from New York (state)
20th-century American politicians